is a 2000 Japanese action-thriller film directed by Kinji Fukasaku, with a screenplay written by Kenta Fukasaku, based on the controversial 1999 novel by Koushun Takami. Starring Tatsuya Fujiwara, Aki Maeda, Tarō Yamamoto, and Takeshi Kitano, the film follows a group of junior-high-school students forced to fight to the death by the Japanese totalitarian government. The film drew controversy and was banned or excluded from distribution in several countries; Toei Company refused to sell the film to any United States distributor for over a decade due to concerns about potential controversy and lawsuits, until Anchor Bay Entertainment eventually acquired the film in 2010 for a direct-to-video release.

The film was first screened in Tokyo on more than 200 screens on December 16, 2000, with an R15+ rating, which is rarely used in Japan. The film earned critical acclaim and, especially with its DVD releases, drew a large global cult following. It is often regarded as one of Fukasaku's best films, and one of the best films of the 2000s. In 2009, filmmaker Quentin Tarantino praised Battle Royale as his favourite film of the past two decades.

Battle Royale was the last film to be directed by Fukasaku. He also started working on the sequel titled Battle Royale II: Requiem, but died of prostate cancer on January 12, 2003, after shooting only one scene with Kitano. His son Kenta Fukasaku, who wrote the screenplay for both films, completed the film in 2003. This film is notable for having a lot of young unknown actors and actresses who become stars later on.

Plot

In the near-future, following a major recession and high unemployment rate, the Japanese government has passed the "BR ACT" to curb the nation's juvenile delinquency, which takes a random class of delinquent students and send them to the Battle Royale games where only one survivor gets to make it out alive, thus becoming a good citizen of Japan. Middle school student Shuya Nanahara copes with life after his father committed suicide. One day in the middle of the school year, their teacher, Kitano, resigns after being knife-wounded by Yoshitoki Kuninobu, Shuya's best friend. One of Shuya's classmate, Noriko, picks up the knife and secretly keeps it in her possession.

One year later, Shuya's class believes they are taking a field trip, but they are gassed and taken to a remote island. Kitano reappears surrounded by JSDF soldiers, explaining that the class was chosen to participate in the annual Battle Royale as a result of the Act: they have three days to fight to the death until a victor emerges; explosive collars will kill uncooperative students or those within designated "danger zones". Kitano tells the class that they were chosen due to their disobedience. Each student is provided rations, a map, supplies, and a random weapon or item. To prove that this is no game, Kitano kills two of the students for disobedience, one of them being Kuninobu. The students disperse one by one as they get their equipment from the JSDF soldiers.

Initially, most students do not engage in combat but eventually one by one they start to accept their current situation. As the hours goes on, some of the students reveal their true feelings for each other after realizing that death is near, while some try to work together to get rid of the explosive necklaces or to survive as long as possible by making a pact. The first six hours see twelve deaths, with four by suicide. The psychotic but mysterious female classmate who has no friends, Mitsuko Souma, and psychopathic high school student Kazuo Kiriyama become the most dangerous players to others in the game. Transfer student Shogo Kawada lets Shuya go after killing one student, while Shuya accidentally kills another student. Basketball player Shinji Mimura plots to hack into the computer system to disrupt the program, and in the process recruits some of his classmates.

Amid shifting loyalties and violent confrontations, Shuya promises to keep Noriko Nakagawa safe, feeling it a duty to his fallen friend, as Kuninobu secretly loved her. They are eventually rescued from Mitsuko Souma by Kawada, who takes them to a safe location after realizing they are of no threat. Kawada reveals to the pair that he won a previous Battle Royale at the cost of his girlfriend, whose sacrificed herself to save him during the end of the last Battle Royale as they were both the sole survivors. He decided to volunteer for the current Battle Royale game to avenge her death by winning the game and killing whoever was in charge at the end. Kiriyama eventually attacks and Shuya is wounded by his Uzi. He is saved by Hiroki Sugimura, who had his best friend die in his arms. A fellow female classmate, Yuko, sees this and falsely believes that Shuya killed Hiroki Sugimura. 

Shuya awakens in the island's lighthouse, bandaged by Yukie Utsumi, who has a crush on him. Five other girls are also hiding in the building, all having made a pact to not participate in the Battle Royale game. Yuko, who is fearful of Shuya, attempts to poison him out of fear of him killing them. However, one of the girls, Yuka, accidentally eats the food, leading to a confrontation between the girls which results in a shootout. Yuko is the only survivor; horrified and full of guilt, she commits suicide by jumping to her death. Shuya, Noriko and Kawada set out to find Mimura.

Meanwhile, Kiriyama meets Mitsuko and kills her after a short battle, making Noriko the last surviving girl. Mimura, with two others, successfully infiltrates the JSDF's computer system and glitches the entire system while the JSDF soldiers begin to panic, causing Kitano to manually reset the whole system. Kiriyama  arrives and kills them, but not before Mimura uses his homemade bomb to blow up the base to hide all evidence and to kill Kiriyama. When the trio arrives at the burning base, Kawada engages in a gun battle with Kiriyama, who survived the explosion but had both his eyes burned out by the explosion. During the shootout, Kawada is injured by Kiriyama's Uzi, while Kawada manages to hit the explosive collar on Kiriyama's neck, causing his entire head to explode.

On the final day, the trio awakens at shore of the island. Kawada, aware of the collars' internal microphones, tells Shuya and Noriko that only one survivor will make it out alive, and seemingly kills Shuya and Noriko by shooting them. Disappointed, Kitano ends the game and shuts off the entire system after hearing the two's apparent deaths through the speaker, telling the JSDF soldiers to end the operation and go home. Kitano waits alone for the winner to return. As Kawada arrives alone, he brings him into the base to be declared the victor but quickly realizes that Kawada hacked the system months beforehand, meaning Mimura and his team were not the real hackers. Kawada had also disabled Shuya and Noriko's tracking devices, thus tricking Kitano into believing the two were dead. Shuya and Noriko arrive and the trio confronts Kitano in the control room. He then unveils a homemade painting of the massacred class with his hope for the outcome of the Battle Royale game, depicting Noriko as the sole survivor. He also reveals his feelings towards her as she was one of the few students who treated him nice as their teacher, which causes Noriko to go into a panic. He reveals that he was unable to bear the hatred between him and his students, having been rejected by his own daughter, and confesses that he always thought of Noriko as a daughter. He asks her to kill him, but Shuya shoots him after he takes out a gun and threatens them, eventually revealed to only be a water gun. Kitano seemly dies from his wounds, but gets up to answer his cellphone which starts to ring. Kitano's daughter calls him; after an argument in which Kitano finally tells his daughter what he really thinks of her, dies of his wounds.

The trio leaves the island on a boat, but Kawada dies from his injuries, happy that he found friendship. Some time later, Noriko sneaks out of her house to meet Shuya, giving Shuya the Seto Dragon Claw butterfly knife Kuninobu used to injure Kitano at the beginning. Shuya and Noriko are declared fugitives by the Japanese government, last seen on the run toward Shibuya Station in the early Tokyo morning.

In the epilogue, it is revealed that Mitsuko Souma had a rough upbringing, almost getting raped by a man while as a young girl, killing the man by pushing him down some stairs. In high school she become reclusive and cannot fit into any groups of friends, feeling abandoned and alone. For the rest of the classmates who had died, they are shown in a school basketball game celebrating a win and enjoying life during a happier time. For Shuya, in his epilogue he dreams of his deceased friend, who tells him to move on with his life and that everything will be okay. For Noriko, she thinks back to the time she met Kitano for ice cream bars after he had left the school after being attacked. While the two walk along the river she optimistically reveals to him that she has the knife that wounded him in her possession, in which Kitano pauses then responds back to her with "In this moment, what should an adult say to a kid?”

Cast

Production

Casting
Roughly 6,000 actors auditioned for the film, which was narrowed down to 800 potential cast members. These finalists were subjected to a 6-month period of physical fitness training under supervision of the director, Kinji Fukasaku, who eventually cast 42 out of the 800.

Despite the characters being middle school students, Aki Maeda, Yukihiro Kotani, Takayo Mimura, Yukari Kanasawa were the only four who were aged 15 to 16 years old. The other members of the cast had all graduated from secondary education, and Tarō Yamamoto and Masanobu Andō were the oldest among the actors, aged 25.

The actor–director–comedian Takeshi Kitano (also known as Beat Takeshi) was cast in the role of the teacher. His casting served several purposes. As one of the most successful Japanese celebrities of the last few decades, both domestically and internationally, he helped draw a large audience to the film. And more vividly, he was a real game show presenter, known for hosting popular Japanese game shows such as Takeshi's Castle (1986–1990), adding a sense of potential realism to the film's extreme game show concept.

Creative process
Kinji Fukasaku stated that he decided to direct the film because the novel it was adapted from reminded him of his time as a 15-year-old munitions factory worker during World War II. At that time, his class was made to work in a munitions factory. In July 1945, the factory came under artillery fire from US navy warships. The children could not escape so they dived under each other for cover. The surviving members of the class had to dispose of the corpses. At that point, Fukasaku realised that the Japanese government was lying about World War II, and he developed a burning hatred of adults in general that he maintained for a long time afterwards.

Beat Takeshi told a documentary crew during filming that he believes "an actor's job is to satisfy the director ... I move the way I'm told to. I try to look the way I'm told to. I don't know much about the emotional side", before adding, "Mr. Fukasaku told me to play myself. I did not really understand, but he told me to play myself, as I ordinarily would be! I'm just trying to do what he tells me."

When asked in an interview with The Midnight Eye if the film is "a warning or advice to the young", Kinji Fukasaku responded by describing the words "warning" and "advice" as "sounding very strong to me" as if they were actions which one tries to accomplish; therefore the film would not be "particularly a warning or advice." Fukasaku explained that the film, which he describes as "a fable", includes themes such as juvenile crime(s), which in Japan "are very much real modern issues." Fukasaku said that he did not have a lack of concern or a lack of interest; he used the themes as part of his fable. When the interviewer told Fukasaku that he asked the question specifically because of the word "run" in the concluding text, which the interviewer described as "very positive", Fukasaku explained that he developed the concept throughout the film. Fukasaku interpreted the interviewer's question as having "a stronger meaning" than "a simple message." He further explained that the film simply contains his "words to the next generation", so the viewer should decide whether to take the words as advice or as a warning.

Music
The film score of Battle Royale was composed, arranged and conducted by Masamichi Amano, performed by the Warsaw Philharmonic Orchestra and features several pieces of Western classical music along with Amano's original compositions. The choral movement used in the film's overture and original trailer is the "Dies Irae" from Giuseppe Verdi's Requiem.

The song used during the end credits, "Shizuka na Hibi no Kaidan o" by the rap rock band Dragon Ash, is not included in either the Japanese or French edition of the soundtrack.

Track listing

Theatrical release

Controversies
Fukasaku originally opposed the R15+ rating given by the Eiga Rinri Kanri Iinkai (Eirin) because of Fukasaku's experiences as a teenager, the novel's use of 15-year-olds, and the fact that many of the actors were around fifteen years of age. After he submitted an appeal and before Eiga Rinri Kanri Iinkai could rule on the appeal, members of the National Diet said that the film harmed teenagers; the Diet members also criticised the film industry ratings, which were a part of self-regulation by the Japanese film industry. Fukasaku dropped the appeal to appease the Japanese Diet in hopes they would not pursue increasing film regulation further. Fukasaku criticized the ruling since the film was already blocked from people under 16 years of age.

The film was labeled "crude and tasteless" by members of National Diet and other government officials after the film was screened for them before its general release. Fukasaku stated that the Diet members had preconceived biases, making them unable to understand the points of the film. The film created a debate over government action on media violence. At one point, director Kinji Fukasaku gave a press statement directed at the age group of the film's characters, saying "you can sneak in, and I encourage you to do so." Many conservative politicians used the film to blame popular culture for a youth crime wave. Ilya Garger of Time magazine said that Battle Royale received "free publicity" and received "box-office success usually reserved for cartoons and TV-drama spin-offs." The Japanese reaction to the film in the early 2000s has been compared to the British outrage over A Clockwork Orange in the early 1970s. Fukasaku stated that he felt discomfort with it even though publicity increased due to the controversy.

Critics note the relation of Battle Royale to the increasingly extreme trend in Asian cinema and its similarity to reality television.

For eleven years, the film was never officially released in the United States or Canada, except for screenings at various film festivals. The film was screened to a test audience in the U.S. during the early 2000s, not long after the Columbine High School massacre, resulting in a negative reaction to the film's content. According to the book Japanese Horror Cinema, "Conscious of the Columbine syndrome, which also influenced the reception of The Matrix (1999), much of the test audience for Battle Royale condemned the film for its 'mindless' and gratuitous violence in terms very reminiscent of the British attitude towards Sam Peckinpah's Straw Dogs (1971) on its initial release."

No North American distribution agreement for the film had ever been reached due to myriad corporate and legal concerns on the parts of both the Japanese Toei Company and prospective North American studios, despite mutual interest. It was said in 2005 by a representative of a prospective U.S. distributor that Japanese executives from the Toei Company were advised by American lawyers who attended test screenings in the early 2000s that "they'd go to jail" had the film been mass-released in the United States at the time. In the company's best interests, Toei attached prohibitive rules, costs, and legal criteria to any possible North American distribution deal. Toei representative Hideyuki Baba stated that the reason for "withholding distribution" in North America was "due to the picture's contents and theme." A representative for a prospective US distributor criticised Toei for expecting a wide release rather than a limited art house run, noting that "in the US it will never get past the MPAA ratings board, and the major theater chains will never play it un-rated. If you cut it enough to get an R rating there'd be nothing left."

In April 2013, the film was banned in Germany, but subsequently the ban was lifted following an objection by the German distributor Capelight Pictures.

Releases
Battle Royale was released on December 16, 2000, in Japan. Over the next two years, Battle Royale was distributed to cinemas in 22 countries, across Asia, Australia, Europe, and South America (in addition to Mexico), gaining early cult film followings in France, the United Kingdom, Germany, Spain, and the Philippines. The first showing in the US was at the Pacific Film Archive in Berkeley, California, in 2002.

The original 113-minute version of the film began its first North American theatrical run at the Cinefamily Theater in Los Angeles on December 24, 2011 – 11 years after its original Japanese release. The planned 9-day run was extended another 6 days due to popular demand. Beginning in early 2012, the film has been publicly exhibited at screenings in many American universities, including those in Wisconsin, Oklahoma, Texas and Massachusetts, with a New York City run at the IFC Center that began on May 25, 2012. As of June 2012, it has been regularly showing at the Projection Booth Theatre, site of the former Gerrard Cinema in Toronto, Ontario, Canada. The Cleveland Cinematheque also held a screening of the film on April 3, 2012.

Special edition
A special edition of the film was released after the original which has eight extra minutes of running time. Unusually, the extra material includes scenes newly filmed after the release of the original. Inserted scenes include (but are not limited to):
 Flashbacks to a basketball game which is used as a framework for the entire story.
 A flashback that expands on a likely contributor to Mitsuko Souma's mental illness or sociopathy. She comes home from school to find her mother drunk with a strange man, who tries to molest her. She then pushes him down the staircase to his death.
 Three epilogues (referred to as "requiems"). The first is an extension of the basketball scene, showing the students of Class 3-B winning their game. It also spotlights Mitsuko's apparent social anxiety and alienation from the classmates in 3-B. The second is a vision of Nobu telling Shuya to take care of Noriko (a replay of a hallucination seen earlier in the special version of the film). The third is a scene between Kitano and Noriko, who talk casually by a riverbank; parts of this scene (a dream sequence) also appear in the original version of the film, but with the dialogue muted whereas in the requiem it is audible and reveals a friendship or other relationship that may or may not have existed between Noriko and Kitano.
 Added shots of the lighthouse after the shoot-out.
 Added reaction shots in the classroom, and extensions to existing shots.
 Extra CGI throughout the film.

3D theatrical re-release
The film was released to theaters in 3D in Japan on November 20, 2010. Fukasaku's son and the film's screenwriter, Kenta Fukasaku, oversaw the conversion. The 3D version was also screened at the Glasgow Film Festival on 24 February 2011. Anchor Bay Entertainment planned to release the 3D version in the United States sometime in 2011, but the release was cancelled.

Home media

Sasebo slashing controversy
The creators of the sequel postponed the release of the DVD (originally scheduled for June 9, 2004) to later that year because of the Sasebo slashing, in which the killer had read Battle Royale.

Limited edition release
Arrow Video released the film on Blu-ray and DVD in a limited edition version in the United Kingdom on December 13, 2010, as a three-disc collector's edition set, featuring both cuts of the film. The DVD version was limited to 5,000 copies. The Blu-ray version was initially being released as limited to 5,000 copies but due to the large volume of pre-orders was increased to 10,000 copies. The limited edition Blu-ray is region-free, meaning it can play on Blu-ray players worldwide. The DVD is also region-free.

In 2021, Arrow Video announced a new limited edition Blu-ray and 4K Ultra HD Blu-ray boxset featuring both cuts of the film in a new 4K restoration, as well as both cuts of the sequel on Blu-ray.

United States release
For a long time, Toei refused to sell the film to a United States distributor, because Toei worried that the film would get involved in legal troubles in the United States. Eventually, Toei agreed to sell the film's United States rights to Anchor Bay Entertainment in 2010.

An official DVD and Blu-ray edition of the film (and its sequel) was released in North America on March 20, 2012, by Anchor Bay Entertainment. The film is available in a standard edition featuring the two films and a 4-disc Complete Collection that features both the Special Edition (labelled the Director's Cut) and the theatrical version of the first film, the sequel, and a disc of behind-the-scenes material.

Reception

Box office
During the first weekend, it grossed . It went on to domestically gross , making it the third highest-grossing Japanese film of 2001, after the anime films Spirited Away and Pokémon 4Ever.

The film also grossed $339,954 in South Korea, Chile, and Argentina, in addition to $26,099 in Taiwan.

Critical reception
 Metacritic assigned the film a weighted average score of 81 out of 100 based on seven critics, indicating "universal acclaim." Robert Koehler of Variety commented, "Given the most basic characters to work with, the mostly teen cast attacks the material with frightening gusto, and Fujiwara dutifully invokes the voice of inner moral conflict. Production is exceedingly handsome and vigorous, offering no sign that Fukasaku is slowing down." He stated that, "returning to his roots as Japan's maestro of mayhem, Kinji Fukasaku has delivered" one of "his most outrageous and timely films", comparing it to "the outrage over youth violence" that Stanley Kubrick's A Clockwork Orange "generated in early-'70s Britain" and featuring some of "the most startling scenes of mayhem since the movies of the wild and bloody '70s." Jason Korsner of BBC News gave Battle Royale four out of five stars, stating that it is "a heart-stopping action film, teaching us the worthy lessons of discipline, teamwork, and determination, but wrapping them up in a deliberately provocative, shockingly violent package." BBC users gave the film five out of five stars. Almar Haflidason of BBC also gave the film five out of five stars. In a review for Empire, critic Kim Newman gave the film four stars out of five. He compared it to Lord of the Flies in how it makes audiences "wonder what they would do in the same situation", but wrote that Battle Royale gives "even harder choices for its school-uniformed characters." He concluded that, "Some will be uncomfortable or appalled, and the mix of humour and horror is uneasy, but this isn't a film you'll forget easily. And, seriously, what would you do?"

The Guardian critic Peter Bradshaw gave the film four stars in September 2001, choosing it as the best film of the week. He praised Takeshi Kitano's performance as the teacher and some of the scenes as "a stunningly proficient piece of action film-making, plunging us into a world of delirium and fear." He notes that, among "the hail of bullets and the queasy gouts of blood, troubling narratives of yearning and sadness are played out. It is as if the violence of Battle Royale is not a satire of society at all, but simply a metaphor for the anguish of adolescent existence." He concluded that, while some "will find the explicit violence of this movie repulsive", it "is a film put together with remarkable confidence and flair. Its steely candour, and weird, passionate urgency make it compelling." Bryant Frazer of Deep Focus gave it a B+ rating and called it "a vicious take-off on reality TV that turns a high-school milieu dominated by cliques and childish relationships into a war zone." British critic Jonathan Ross stated that "if you want to catch a wildly original and super-cool slice of entertainment before it gets remade and ruined by the Americans, then I suggest you try hard not to miss it" and concluded that "it's a wildly imaginative example of just what can be achieved in a teen movie." In 2009, filmmaker Quentin Tarantino praised Battle Royale as the best film he had seen in the past two decades, stating that, "If there's any movie that's been made since I've been making movies that I wish I had made, it's that one."

There has been renewed interest in the film following its 2012 Blu-ray release in the United States. Chris Nashawaty of Entertainment Weekly rates the film as "A" grade, positing that examination of the students' different motives for survival or subversion of the Program is a "sick blast". A.O. Scott of The New York Times gave the film a positive review, stating "[the] expertly choreographed scenes of mayhem are at once comical and appalling, and [Fukasaku's] young cast embraces the melodramatic extremity of the story with impressive conviction", adding that Battle Royale "is in many ways a better movie [than The Hunger Games] and in any case a fascinating companion, drawn from a parallel cultural universe. It is a lot uglier and also, perversely, a lot more fun." Entertainment critic for the Cary Darling describes Battle Royale as "tense, tragic and timely ... a modern-day horror story imbued with an electric sense of drama and dread." Alexandra Cavallo of the Boston Phoenix writes, "Battle Royale is The Hunger Games not diluted for young audiences" while giving the film three stars out of four. Jeffrey M. Anderson of Combustible Celluloid gave the film 4 out of 4 stars, calling it a "gloriously sick and twisted story" and claiming that it is "endlessly entertaining, by turns gory and hilarious, disturbing and exciting." In the Chicago Sun-Times, Roger Ebert's Australia correspondent Michael Mirasol praised Battle Royale for its "thoughtful characterisation" that is "lavished upon all the students" and concluded that it is an "intensely violent fable aimed at a young audience, but with true feeling, intelligence, and respect." Jake Mulligan of The Suffolk Voice gave it five out of five stars, stating that "the influence of "Royale" on works as disparate as "Kill Bill" and "The Hunger Games" cannot be measured" and describing Battle Royale as "Provocative, funny, violent, and aided by a script that somehow gives equal attention to most of the students while also displaying the well-thought out minutia behind the narrative."

R.L. Shaffer of IGN gave the film a score of 8 out of 10, taking "a moment to thank The Hunger Games for reminding us how awesome Battle Royale really is" and concluding that Battle Royale is "a masterpiece of mayhem, violence and unfettered teen melodrama." J. Hurtado of Twitch Film noted that many "reviews of Battle Royale focus on the violence, which is extreme to be sure, and not so much on the humanity of the film." He stated that "cranking up that already elevated hormonal level of emotional hysteria by throwing these students into a real life-or-death situation is incredibly effective" and that "the story of Battle Royale is the story of those teenage years and just how wrong we all were about the extent of our emotional turmoil." DVD Talk gave the original theatrical cut of the film 4.5 out of 5 stars and 4 out of 5 for the Director's Cut, concluding that it gives "a glimpse into what might very well happen should the rules of society, such as they are, ever do crumble to the point where it's everyone for themselves. There's enough black humor here and enough tense action that the film never quite feels bleak or depressing (though it does come close) – but most importantly it makes you think." Devon Ashby of CraveOnline gave the film a score of 8.5 out of 10, referring to it as "Japanese legend Kinji Fukasaku's adolescent shooting spree opus" and "a compassionate and technically accomplished masterpiece." Brent McKnight of PopMatters gave the film a score of 9 out of 10, describing it as "savage, sharp, satirical, and brutally funny" and "a bleak commentary on humanity and society."

Film critics Robert Davis and Riccardo de los Rios praise the film's narrative structure. They comment that in adapting a story such as Battle Royale which requires a suspension of disbelief to go along with its "far-fetched" story Fukasaku instead turns conventional rules of screenwriting on its head. Instead of focusing on the detail of the premise of a near future where school kids kill one another "the filmmakers dispense with premise in a short series of title cards". As the last film to be fully directed by Fukasaku, the Directory of World Cinema refers to Battle Royale as "perhaps the finest cinematic swansong ever conceived."

Social and political interpretations
An interpretation of the film is that it represents Japanese generational attitudes that are creating social, political and economic divides between the young and old. Fukasaku himself has stated: "The children who have grown up and witnessed what happened to the adults, their anxiety became heightened as well. So I set Battle Royale within this context of children versus adults."

Accolades
At the 2001 Japanese Academy Awards, Battle Royale was nominated for nine awards, including Picture of the Year, and won three of them. The film was nominated for two awards from international film festivals but failed to win.

Legacy
In 2009, Quentin Tarantino listed Battle Royale as his favorite film released since he began directing in 1992. That same year, Moviefone included it in the top three of its "50 Best Movies of the Decade" list. Jon Condit of Dread Central called it "one of the best movies [he's] ever seen." Bloody Disgusting ranked the film fifteenth in its list of the "Top-20 Horror Film of the Decade", with the article calling the film "a go-for-broke extravaganza: fun, provocative, ultra-violent, and bound to arouse controversy (which it did) ... the film [is] more than just an empty provocation – it builds character through action, a method all good filmmakers should seek to emulate." In 2010, Empire ranked Battle Royale #235 and #82 on their lists of "The 500 Greatest Movies of All Time" and "The 100 Best Films of World Cinema" respectively. Time magazine included the film in its list of Top 10 Ridiculously Violent Movies. In 2012, The Independent included it in its "10 best sports movies ever made" list. Complex magazine ranked it #47 in its list of The 50 Best Action Movies of All Time.

Sequel

Kinji Fukasaku, who directed the first film, began work on a sequel, entitled Requiem, but died of prostate cancer on January 12, 2003, after shooting only one scene with Takeshi Kitano. His son Kenta Fukasaku directed the rest of the film, which was released on May 18, 2003.

Unlike the first film, the sequel is not adapted from a novel, but was based on an original screenplay written by Kenta Fukasaku. The plot revolves around the survivor Shuya Nanahara leading a terrorist rebellion, but was controversial for its provocative anti-American sentiments and criticised for being inferior to the original.

Remake plans
In June 2006, Variety reported that New Line Cinema, with producers Neil Moritz and Roy Lee, intended to produce a new adaptation of Battle Royale. Several Web sites echoed the news, including Ain't It Cool News, which claimed the remake would be "an extremely Hard R – serious-minded Americanisation of Battle Royale." New Line tentatively set a release date of 2008.

The next month, The New York Times reported on an Internet backlash against the remake. Through the article, Lee assured fans of his respect for the original work, claiming, "This is the one I'm going to be the most careful with." He stated that, despite earlier concerns, the film would not be toned down to PG or PG-13, the characters would remain young teenagers, and that it would draw elements equally from the novel, the original film, and the manga. The reporter noted "the hubbub ... was at least slightly premature [as] New Line hasn't yet purchased the remake rights."

Following the Virginia Tech massacre in April 2007, Lee claimed that prospects for the remake had been "seriously shaken". While he remained willing to proceed, he stated, "we might be a little more sensitive to some of the issues." The reporting article noted that New Line still had not secured remake rights – its spokeswoman claimed "no news" when asked about progress on any deal.

Maclean's pointed out that the 2008 novel The Hunger Games, and its subsequent 2012 film adaptation, have similar themes. Although Hunger Games author Suzanne Collins maintains that she "had never heard of that book until [her] book was turned in", The New York Times reports that "the parallels are striking enough that Collins's work has been savaged on the blogosphere as a baldfaced ripoff" and that "there are enough possible sources for the plot line that the two authors might well have hit on the same basic setup independently." The 2012 film adaptation has also faced similar criticisms for similarities to Battle Royale.

In March 2012, Roy Lee reported that a remake of Battle Royale would no longer be possible due to the release of The Hunger Games, stating, "Audiences would see it as just a copy of Games – most of them wouldn't know that Battle Royale came first. It's unfair, but that's reality." However, he stated that he might return to the film in ten years to "develop a "Battle Royale movie for the next generation."

American TV series
During the summer of 2012, The CW had been in discussion with the Hollywood representatives about the possibility of turning Battle Royale into an American television show. According to a spokesperson, the talks were only preliminary, but if a deal could be reached, the network would acquire rights to Koushun Takami's underlying novel, then unpack and expand on it for an hour-long dramatic series. Joyce Jun, a Hollywood attorney representing U.S. rights to the title, stated that "there is no deal in place". A CW spokesman confirmed only there had been some discussion, but declined to comment further.

Cultural impact

The film, especially with its DVD releases, drew a large global cult following and became a cultural phenomenon. Quentin Tarantino considers Battle Royale to be one of the most influential films in recent decades. The film has been highly influential in global popular culture, inspiring numerous works of fiction in a number of different media across the world.

Film and television
Since its release, the film has had an influence on filmmakers such as Quentin Tarantino, most notably his Kill Bill films; the character Gogo Yubari, played by Chiaki Kuriyama, resembles the character she plays in Battle Royale, Takako Chigusa. Battle Royale has also been referenced in the 2004 zombie comedy film Shaun of the Dead, where Edgar Wright and Simon Pegg made sure a big Battle Royale poster is prominently displayed in Shaun's living room. Despite not being officially released in the United States for a long time, Battle Royale has often been referenced in American pop culture, ranging from Tarantino's films to the rock band The Flaming Lips' use of footage from the film as a backdrop for its Yoshimi Battles the Pink Robots tour, along with references in Hollywood films such as Jason Reitman's Thank You for Smoking (2005) and Juno (2007) and American television shows such as Lost and Community. In Wrong Turn 2: Dead End, one of the characters (Matthew Currie Holmes as Michael "M" Epstein) wears a Battle Royale Shirt.

Maggie Lee of Reuters describes Battle Royale as the "film that pioneered the concept of the teen death game", citing its influence on films such as Kaiji (2009) and Hideo Nakata's The Incite Mill (2010), both of which starred Tatsuya Fujiwara (who played Battle Royale protagonist Shuya Nanahara) in the leading roles. V.A. Musetto of the New York Post compared it to The Condemned (2007), which the critic called "a bad rip-off" of Battle Royale as well as The Most Dangerous Game.

Critics have also noted the influence of Battle Royale on other films, such as the 2008 film Kill Theory, the 2009 film The Tournament, and The Hunger Games trilogy. Battle Royale has also drawn comparisons to films such as Gamer (2009), Kick-Ass (2010), and The Belko Experiment (2016). Other examples of "battle royale" films include The Purge series (2013), Assassination Nation (2018), Ready or Not (2019), and The Hunt (2020). The South Korean Netflix original series Squid Game (2021) was also influenced by Battle Royale.

Comics, manga and anime
In Japan, the film established the battle royale genre of manga and anime, revolving around a similar narrative premise. Along with the Battle Royale manga (2000 debut), other examples of the genre include Basilisk (2003 debut), Bokurano (2003 debut), the Fate/stay night franchise (2004 debut), Future Diary (2006 debut), Deadman Wonderland (2007 debut), the Danganronpa franchise (2010 debut), Magical Girl Raising Project (2012 debut), and the Death Parade series (2013 debut). Battle Royale has also drawn comparisons to the Gantz franchise of manga (2000), anime (2004) and films (2011). Btooom (2009 debut) features a variation of the battle royale theme.

The film has influenced the creation of the Marvel Comics series Avengers Arena. The series' logo also mirrors that of the logo used in the Battle Royale movie.

Video games and visual novels

The genre of battle royale video games, in which players compete to be the last one standing in a shrinking battlefield, was inspired by and took its name from the film. The genre became popular in the late 2010s, and includes games such as PlayerUnknown's Battlegrounds, Fortnite Battle Royale, ARMA 3, H1Z1: King of the Kill, Knives Out, Rules of Survival, Garena Free Fire, Apex Legends, Realm Royale, Call of Duty: Black Ops 4s "Blackout" game mode, and Call of Duty: Warzone.

The film's title also refers to the battle royale genre of visual novels, revolving around a similar narrative premise. Examples include the Fate/stay night series (2004 debut), Dies irae (2007), and the Zero Escape series (2009 debut). The Danganronpa series (2010 debut) is also notably influenced by the film, with its scenario writer Kazutaka Kodaka citing the film as an influence. Battle Royale has also drawn comparisons to Square Enix's The World Ends with You (2007).

See also
 Cinema of Japan
 List of cult films

References

External links

 
 
 
 
 
 Review and analysis of the Battle Royale film
 
 
 Battle Royale 3D Official Website 

Films about teenagers
Battle Royale (franchise)
2000 films
2000 action thriller films
Battle royale
2000s dystopian films
Japanese action thriller films
2000s Japanese-language films
Films based on Japanese novels
Films based on science fiction novels
Films based on thriller novels
Films directed by Kinji Fukasaku
Films set on uninhabited islands
Films shot in Tokyo
Girls with guns films
Films about death games
Film controversies in Japan
Obscenity controversies in film
Japanese splatter films
Toei Company films
Films set on fictional islands
Films scored by Masamichi Amano
2000s Japanese films